This is a list of Catholic technical institutes in Pakistan. It includes Catholic technical institutes which do not warrant independent articles of their own.

 Don Bosco Technical Institute, Lahore
 St. Joseph's Technical Institute, Faisalabad
 St. Patrick's Institute of Science & Technology, Karachi
 Sargodha Institute of Technology